Jana Maláčová (born 24 June 1981) is a Czech politician and member of the Czech Social Democratic Party (ČSSD). In July 2018 she took up the post as the Minister of Labour and Social Affairs in the Czech Republic in the Government led by Andrej Babiš. Between March 2019 and December 2021 she was also deputy chairperson of the ČSSD.

She was a candidate in the December 2021 Czech Social Democratic Party leadership election.

Life 
Jana Maláčová was born 24 June 1981 in the town of Uherské Hradiště. is educated at Goethe University in Frankfurt DE, and London School of Economics (LSE) in the UK. After finishing her undergraduate studies in 2007, Maláčová worked for the Ministry of Regional Development. Between 2012 and 2014 she worked as the representative for the Senate of the Czech Republic to the European Parliament in Brussels and later served as communications director for the Czech Government on European Union issues. In June 2015, she was appointed the head of Family and Aging policy at the Ministry of Labour and Social Affairs, before becoming Minister on 30 July 2018 following the resignation of Petr Krčál. She speaks Czech, German, and English.  Ms. Maláčová is married to Mr. Aleš Chmelař and has a son.

References 

1981 births
Goethe University Frankfurt alumni
Alumni of the London School of Economics
Czech Social Democratic Party Government ministers
Living people
Labour and Social Affairs ministers of the Czech Republic
People from Uherské Hradiště
Women government ministers of the Czech Republic